Peter Jonathan Hitchens (born 28 October 1951) is an English conservative author, broadcaster, journalist, and commentator. He writes for The Mail on Sunday and was a foreign correspondent reporting from both Moscow and Washington, D.C. Peter Hitchens has contributed to The Spectator, The American Conservative, The Guardian, First Things, Prospect, and the New Statesman. He has published numerous books, including The Abolition of Britain, The Rage Against God, The War We Never Fought and The Phoney Victory.

Previously a socialist and supporter of the Labour Party, Hitchens became more conservative during the 1990s. He joined the Conservative Party in 1997 and left in 2003, and has since been deeply critical of the party,  which he views as the biggest obstacle to true conservatism in the UK. Hitchens describes himself as a Burkean conservative, social democrat, and Anglo Gaullist. His conservative Christian political views, such as his opposition to same-sex marriage and support of stricter recreational drug policies, have been met with criticism and debate in the United Kingdom.

Hitchens has criticised the UK's response to the COVID-19 pandemic, especially lockdowns and mandates that the public wear face masks. He has been accused of promoting misinformation about the pandemic and public health restrictions by several sources.

Personal life

Early life and family 
Peter Hitchens was born in Malta, where his father, Eric Ernest Hitchens (1909–1987), a naval officer, was stationed as part of the then Mediterranean Fleet of the Royal Navy. His mother, Yvonne Jean Hitchens (née Hickman; 1921–1973) had met Eric while serving in the Women's Royal Naval Service (Wrens) during World War II.

As a youth, Hitchens wanted to be an officer in the Royal Navy, following his father. However, when he was 10, he learned he had a lazy eye that could not be corrected, thereby barring him from serving in the Royal Navy.

Hitchens attended Mount House School, Tavistock, the Leys School, and the Oxford College of Further Education before being accepted at the University of York, where he studied Philosophy and Politics and was a member of Alcuin College, graduating in 1973.

Hitchens married Eve Ross in 1983. They have a daughter and two sons. Their elder son, Dan, was editor of the Catholic Herald, a London-based Roman Catholic newspaper. Hitchens lives in Oxford.

Religion 
Hitchens was brought up in the Christian faith and attended Christian boarding schools but became an atheist, beginning to leave his faith at 15. He returned to church later in life, and is now an Anglican and a member of the Church of England.

Hitchens has Jewish descent via his maternal grandmother, a daughter of Polish Jewish migrants. His grandmother revealed this fact upon meeting his wife Eve Ross. Though his brother Christopher was quick to embrace his Jewish identity following the principle of matrilineal descent, Peter noted that they were only one-32nd Jewish by descent and has not identified as Jewish himself.

Relationship with his brother 
 
Hitchens' only sibling was the journalist and author Christopher Hitchens, who was two years older. Christopher said in 2005 that the main difference between the two was belief in the existence of God. Peter was a member of the International Socialists (forerunners of the modern Socialist Workers' Party) from 1968 to 1975 (beginning at age 17) after Christopher introduced him to them. The brothers fell out after Peter wrote a 2001 article in The Spectator which allegedly characterised Christopher as a Stalinist.

After the birth of Peter's third child, the two brothers reconciled. Peter's review of his brother's book God Is Not Great led to a public argument between the brothers but no renewed estrangement. In the review, Peter wrote that his brother's book made a number of incorrect assertions.

In 2007, the brothers appeared as panellists on BBC TV's Question Time, where they clashed on a number of issues. In 2008, in the US, they debated the 2003 invasion of Iraq and the existence of God. In 2010 at the Pew Research Center, the pair debated the nature of God in civilisation. Christopher died in 2011; at a memorial service held for him in New York, Peter read St Paul's Philippians 4:8,  which Christopher had read at their father's funeral.

Journalism 
He joined the Labour Party in 1977 but left shortly after campaigning for Ken Livingstone in 1979, thinking it was wrong to carry a party card when directly reporting politics, and coinciding with a culmination of growing personal disillusionment with the Labour movement.

Hitchens began his journalistic career on the local press in Swindon and then at the Coventry Evening Telegraph. He then worked for the Daily Express between 1977 and 2000, initially as a reporter specialising in education and industrial and labour affairs, then as a political reporter, and subsequently as deputy political editor. Leaving parliamentary journalism to cover defence and diplomatic affairs, he reported on the decline and collapse of communist regimes in several Warsaw Pact countries, which culminated in a stint as Moscow correspondent and reporting on life there during the final months of the Soviet Union and the early years of the Russian Federation in 1990–92. He took part in reporting the UK 1992 general election, closely following Neil Kinnock. He then became the Daily Express Washington correspondent. Returning to Britain in 1995, he became a commentator and columnist.

Hitchens reported from Somalia at the time of the United Nations intervention in the Somali Civil War.

In 2000, Hitchens left the Daily Express after its acquisition by Richard Desmond, stating that working for him would have represented a moral conflict of interest. Hitchens joined The Mail on Sunday, where he has a weekly column and weblog in which he debates directly with readers. Hitchens has also written for The Spectator and The American Conservative magazines, and occasionally for The Guardian, Prospect, and the New Statesman.

After being shortlisted in 2007 and 2009, Hitchens won the Orwell Prize in political journalism in 2010. Peter Kellner, one of the Orwell Prize judges, described Hitchens's writing as being "as firm, polished and potentially lethal as a Guardsman's boot."

A regular on British radio and television, Hitchens has been on Question Time, Any Questions?, This Week, The Daily Politics and The Big Questions. He has authored and presented several documentaries on Channel 4, including critical examinations of Nelson Mandela and David Cameron. In the late 1990s, Hitchens co-presented a programme on Talk Radio UK with Derek Draper and Austin Mitchell.

In 2010, Hitchens was described by Edward Lucas in The Economist as "a forceful, tenacious, eloquent and brave journalist. He lambasts woolly thinking and crooked behaviour at home and abroad." In 2009, Anthony Howard wrote of Hitchens, "the old revolutionary socialist has lost nothing of his passion and indignation as the years have passed us all by. It is merely the convictions that have changed, not the fervour and fanaticism with which they continue to be held."

Political views

Hitchens describes himself as a Burkean conservative, a social democrat and more recently, a Gaullist. In 2010, Michael Gove, writing in The Times, asserted that, for Hitchens, what is more important than the split between the Left and the Right is "the deeper gulf between the restless progressive and the Christian pessimist." Hitchens joined the Conservative Party in 1997 and left in 2003. This was when he challenged Michael Portillo for the Conservative nomination in the Kensington and Chelsea seat in 1999.

He has been consistently dismissive of the modern UK Conservative Party since the 1990s. This is because he believes that the party has since then abandoned true social conservatism. His view is that conservatism should embody a Burkean sense of public duty, conscience and the rule of law, which he sees as the best guarantee of liberty. Furthermore, this view holds a general hostility to hasty reforms and adventurism. This was central to his criticism of many policy proposals by the New Labour government, which he viewed as attacks on liberty and facets of a constitutional revolution. He believes the Conservative Party should be a defender of establishment institutions such as the Church of England and the Monarchy, but has shifted to social liberalism instead. He believes that atheism, along with cultural liberalism, are the causes of the systematic undermining of Christianity. Hitchens has written "The left's real interests are moral, cultural, sexual and social. They lead to a powerful state. This is not because they actively set out to achieve one." He also believes that the First World War and the devolution of marriage are the causes of the demise of Christianity in Europe.

In his book The Cameron Delusion, Hitchens argues that in the last few decades, the party has become virtually "indistinguishable from Blairite New Labour". He thinks the Conservative Party is now just a vehicle for "obtaining office for the sons of gentlemen" and he loathes the party. Hitchens's claim that the "Conservatives are now the main Left-wing party in the country" in his Mail on Sunday column has been met with much criticism.

He is in favour of capital punishment, and was the only British journalist to attend and write about the execution of British-born Nicholas Ingram in America in 1995. He supports first-past-the-post voting. He is opposed to the privatisation of railways.

Hitchens has been a prominent member of the campaign to clear the name of the late Bishop of Chichester, George Bell from allegations of child sexual abuse. He has argued that the Church of England convicted him in what he described as a kangaroo court, and stated his wish that allegations are not treated as proven facts. He is a supporter of grammar schools.

Writings and thought

War and terrorism 
He was opposed to the NATO intervention in Kosovo and 2003 US-led invasion of Iraq, arguing that neither was in the interests of either Britain or the United States, and opposed the war in Afghanistan.

He believes that the UK should never have participated in World War I, and is very critical of the view that World War II was "The Good War". His view on World War II is laid out in his book The Phoney Victory, in which he argues that the UK entered World War II too early, and that the UK overly glorifies World War II. He argues that while the allies were fighting a radical evil, they sometimes used immoral methods, such as the carpet bombing of German civilians. He believes that Britain's entry into World War II led to its rapid decline after the war. This was because, among other things, it could not finance the war and was not prepared for it. As a result, it had to surrender much of its wealth and power to avoid bankruptcy. Hitchens' views on the UK in World War II have been met with criticism by historians, with Richard J. Evans describing his book The Phoney Victory as 'riddled with errors'.

Hitchens is not anti-war, since he believes that this position often leaves countries defenceless in times of war. Instead, he argues that military power and the threat of war can be deterrents against war. Hitchens wrote about his concern of the use of security (anti-terrorism) legislation and increased police powers under New Labour, and how it has been used to suppress civil liberties. In Channel 4's Dispatches, Hitchens said the result of this legislation was that Britain ended up "sleepwalking into a Big Brother state".

European Union 

Hitchens is very critical of the European Union and argued for many years, before Brexit, that Britain would be better off outside it. In 2017 he endorsed the Flexcit model proposed by Richard North and Christopher Booker as the most sensible and moderate way to leave the EU while remaining in the European Economic Area to preserve the economic benefits of EU membership. However, he did not vote in the 2016 UK EU referendum because he is critical of referendums. Instead of a referendum, he argued that a leave decision would be best done by voting into power a political party whose manifesto committed the country to withdrawal by an act of Parliament.

Vaccination

Hitchens was against the MMR vaccine following the Lancet MMR autism fraud. He asked in a 2001 article: "Is it really our duty to risk our children's lives with this jab?" In 2013, he defended this earlier article, saying he was criticising "State bossiness in an age that has seen a catalogue of mistakes, panics and mysteries in the world of disease and medicine" and referred to the thalidomide scandal. He has defended discredited former doctor Andrew Wakefield.

After being vaccinated against COVID-19 in 2021, Hitchens rejected accusations he is an anti-vaxxer, but said that he was "more or less forced to have an immunisation I would not normally have bothered with".

War on drugs 
Hitchens has written about the enforcement of drug laws, most notably in his book The War We Never Fought (2012). He advocates harsher penalties properly enforced for possession and illegal use of cannabis, claiming that "cannabis has been mis-sold as a soft and harmless substance when in fact it's potentially extremely dangerous." He is opposed to the decriminalisation of recreational drugs in general. In 2012, Hitchens gave evidence to the Parliamentary Home Affairs Select Committee as part of its inquiry into drugs policy, and called for the British government to introduce a more hard-line policy on drugs. Hitchens disagrees with the notion of drug addiction, arguing that it goes against the notion of free will. He says: "People take drugs because they enjoy it."

LGBT rights and marriage 
Hitchens has strongly criticised the transgender rights movement, claiming that it promotes zealotry and that changes in traditional gender roles in society are "destroying truth itself".

Hitchens was one of the most outspoken opponents of same-sex marriage in 2013, the year before same-sex marriage was legal in Britain. In speaking to Guardian journalist Owen Jones in 2015, he said his real issue was with the decline of heterosexual marriage in society and the legalisation "of what was in effect no-fault divorce", and that same-sex marriage is "a side-effect ... It's a consequence of the collapse of heterosexual marriage, and I regret now getting involved in the argument about same-sex marriage, because it was a Stalingrad, a diversion. Why is one worrying about a few thousand people who want to have same-sex marriages, without being at all concerned about the collapse of heterosexual marriage, which involves millions of people, and millions of children?"

In 2019, the University of Buckingham organised a "free-speech society" after Hitchens' "no-platforming" by the University of Portsmouth over his views on gay rights, which they believed would cause conflict with LGBT events on campus. Hitchens was the first guest invited by the society to address students. In response to his being no-platformed by the University of Portsmouth, Hitchens was invited by the Archivist and the Head of History and Politics at The Portsmouth Grammar School to give a short talk on "The myth of Russian aggression" to Sixth Form pupils.

Environment 
Hitchens has claimed that "the greenhouse effect probably doesn't exist" and that the scientific consensus linking global warming to human activity has not been proven, describing it as "modish dogma". He has criticised wind power in the United Kingdom and argued in 2015 that its expansion put the UK at risk of blackouts.

COVID-19 pandemic 
Hitchens has repeatedly criticised the British government's response to the COVID-19 pandemic. He has particularly criticised COVID-19 lockdowns in the UK, suggesting they would have negative consequences and questioning their epidemiological efficacy. He has been described as a "lockdown sceptic". Full Fact evaluated his statement, where he said it was "not possible” for the first lockdown in March to cause the peak in daily infections and deaths to decline, in a fact-checking article, and concluded that this was "wrong" based on available evidence. Hitchens' view was also disputed by Paul Mason in the New Statesman. George Monbiot in The Guardian also critiqued Hitchens' views. Daniel Hannan meanwhile expressed agreement with Hitchens in The Daily Telegraph. A tweet by Hitchens stating four fifths of cases were asymptomatic was also described as "misleading" by Voice of America. Hitchens criticised Imperial College London modelling, which suggested that there could be up to 500,000 COVID-19 deaths if the government did not impose a lockdown.

He has supported Sweden's response to the pandemic. He has opposed the mandatory wearing of face masks during the pandemic, referring to them as "muzzles". He also believes that government mandates to wear face coverings are oppressive.

English independence 
Hitchens has advocated for English nationalism, arguing that the United Kingdom should be dissolved and England should become an independent country once again.

Ukraine 

In 2010, Hitchens argued that Crimea should be part of Russia rather than Ukraine, claiming that the peninsula is historically Russian. In November, 2022, he asserted that there exists a "virulent" nationalism in Ukraine, and claimed that it is easier "to be a non-Scot in Scotland" than "an ethnic Russian in Ukraine" due to the "ugly strain of Ukrainian nationalism that made life difficult for ethnic Russians in Ukraine."

Publications 
Hitchens is the author of The Abolition of Britain (1999) and A Brief History of Crime (2003), both critical of changes in British society since the 1960s. A compendium of his Daily Express columns was published as Monday Morning Blues in 2000. A Brief History of Crime was reissued as The Abolition of Liberty in April 2004, with an additional chapter on identity cards ("Your papers, please"), and with two chapters – on gun control ("Out of the barrel of a gun") and capital punishment ("Cruel and unusual") – removed.

The Broken Compass: How British Politics Lost its Way was published in May 2009, and The Rage Against God was published in Britain in March 2010, and in the US in May. Hitchens's book The War We Never Fought: The British Establishment's Surrender to Drugs, about what he sees as the non-existence of the war on drugs, was published by Bloomsbury in the autumn of 2012.

In June 2014, Hitchens published his first e-book, Short Breaks in Mordor, a compendium of foreign reports. The Phoney Victory: The World War II Illusion was published in August 2018 by I.B. Tauris. It addresses what Hitchens views as the national myth of the Second World War, which he believes did long-term damage to Britain and its position in the world. It was negatively reviewed by the historian Richard Evans in the New Statesman, who described the book as "riddled with errors".

Bibliography 
 
 The Abolition of Britain (1999)
 Monday Morning Blues (2000)
 A Brief History of Crime (2003), updated in paperback as The Abolition of Liberty: The Decline of Order and Justice in England (2004)
 The Broken Compass (2009), updated in paperback as The Cameron Delusion (2010)
 The Rage Against God (2010)
 The War We Never Fought (2012)
 Short Breaks in Mordor (2014)
 The Phoney Victory (2018) 
 Unconventional Wisdom (2020)
 A Revolution Betrayed: How Egalitarians Wrecked the British Education System (2022)

See also 

 Christian right
 Traditionalist conservatism

References

External links 

 
 
 Peter Hitchens's Blog at Mail on Sunday
 
 
 
 

1951 births
Alumni of the University of York
British anti-communists
British male journalists
British people of Polish-Jewish descent
Conservatism in the United Kingdom
Converts to Anglicanism from atheism or agnosticism
Critics of atheism
Daily Express people
Daily Mail journalists
English Anglicans
English bloggers
English columnists
Former Marxists
British social commentators
Living people
People educated at The Leys School
People from Sliema
Socialist Workers Party (UK) members
20th-century British writers
21st-century British writers
Labour Party (UK) people
Conservative Party (UK) people
Critics of multiculturalism
English anti–Iraq War activists
British male bloggers
English nationalists
People educated at Mount House School, Tavistock
English anti-same-sex-marriage activists